Hepatokines (Greek heapto-, liver; and -kinos, movement) are proteins produced by liver cells (hepatocytes) that are secreted into the circulation and function as hormones across the organism. Research is mostly focused on hepatokines that play a role in the regulation of metabolic diseases such as diabetes and fatty liver and include: Adropin, ANGPTL4, Fetuin-A, Fetuin-B, FGF-21, Hepassocin, LECT2, RBP4,Selenoprotein P, Sex hormone-binding globulin.

See also 

 Adipokines
 Myokines

References

Endocrinology
Liver
Peptide hormones